Frank Young (1885 – death date unknown) was an American Negro league second baseman between 1907 and 1910.

A native of Indiana, Young made his debut in 1907 with the Indianapolis ABCs. He went on to play for the Leland Giants and Minneapolis Keystones.

References

External links
 and Seamheads

1885 births
Date of birth missing
Year of death missing
Place of birth missing
Place of death missing
Indianapolis ABCs players
Leland Giants players
Minneapolis Keystones players